Iowa Highway 210 (Iowa 210) is an east–west highway in central Iowa covering .  It begins at Iowa Highway 141 south of Woodward and ends at U.S. Highway 65 south of Collins.  The routing closely parallels and crosses the former Chicago, Milwaukee, St. Paul and Pacific Railroad grade.  Passing through mostly rural farmland, Iowa 210 serves as a collector for two central Iowa freeways — Interstate 35 and Iowa 141.

Route description
Iowa Highway 210 begins at an interchange with Iowa Highway 141 south of Woodward.  Just north of Woodward, and immediately after crossing into Boone County, Iowa 210 turns east at the entrance to the Woodward Resource Center.  The route crosses the meandering Des Moines River next to the former Milwaukee Road high bridge before entering Madrid.  At Madrid, Iowa 210 shares one block, with Iowa Highway 17.

Iowa Highway 210 continues east and enters Story County and the town of Slater.  South of Huxley, Iowa 210 intersects U.S. Highway 69.  East of US 69, Iowa 210 serves as a collector route to Interstate 35, serving, on average, over 4500 vehicles per day.  East of Interstate 35, Iowa Highway 210 primarily serves local traffic.  Iowa 210 serves Cambridge via county highways and Maxwell directly.  South of Collins, Iowa 210 ends at U.S. Highway 65.

History
Iowa Highway 210 was designated on January 8, 1938 as a double-spur route between Slater and Maxwell. It was extended eastward to US 65 and westward to Iowa 141, absorbing Iowa 89, in November 1980. A mile marker 1A exists near mile marker 1 to account for the addition.

Major intersections

Related route

Iowa 89 began at an intersection with Iowa Highway 141 south of Woodward and headed north into the town. Just north of Woodward, and immediately after crossing into Boone County, Iowa 89 turned east at the entrance to the Woodward Resource Center. The route crossed the Des Moines River next to the Milwaukee Road high bridge before entering Madrid. At Madrid, Iowa 89 ended at Iowa 17.  Iowa 89 was absorbed into Iowa 210 in 1980.

References

External links

202